Gareth Huw Evans (born April 1980) is a Welsh film director, screenwriter, editor, and action choreographer. He is best known for the Indonesian action crime films Merantau (2009), The Raid (2011), and The Raid 2 (2014), and for bringing the Indonesian martial art of pencak silat into world cinema through these films. He is also known for creating the action crime drama television series Gangs of London (2020).

Early life
Evans was born and raised in Hirwaun, Cynon Valley. He graduated from the University of Glamorgan (now the University of South Wales) with an MA in screenwriting.

Career
After directing a small-budget film called Footsteps, Evans was hired as a freelance director for a documentary about the Indonesian martial art pencak silat. He became fascinated with it, and discovered Indonesian martial artist Iko Uwais, who was working as a deliveryman for a phone company. Evans cast Uwais in his 2009 film Merantau. He planned to produce a larger action film, but scaled the production budget down and created an action film called The Raid (2011). After the success of The Raid, the larger action film eventually became the basis for its sequel, The Raid 2: Berandal (2014).

In late 2016, Evans started working on his next film, Apostle, which stars Dan Stevens. The film was released by Netflix on 12 October 2018.

In October 2017, TheWrap reported that Evans had pitched his idea for a Deathstroke solo film and is in early talks to write and direct. Evans also passed on directing a Justice League Dark film. However, in April 2020, Evans said that the film had been delayed and that he was no longer actively involved with the project.

Personal life
Evans lived in Jakarta with his wife, Maya, and their daughter, until the family moved back to Wales in 2015.

Filmography
Film

Short film

Television

Awards
In November 2011, The Raid won the Midnight Madness Award at the Toronto International Film Festival in 2011.

References

External links
 
 

1980 births
Living people
Date of birth missing (living people)
Alumni of the University of Glamorgan
Maya Award winners
People from Hirwaun
Welsh emigrants to Indonesia
Welsh film directors
Welsh screenwriters
Action film directors